Disembowelment, often styled as diSEMBOWELMENT, was an Australian death-doom band that formed in November 1989 featuring Renato Gallina on guitar and vocals, and Paul Mazziotta on drums. In early 1991 Jason Kells joined on lead guitar and at the end of that year the group's line-up was completed by Matthew Skarajew on bass guitar. In 1992 they issued an extended play, Dusk, on Relapse Records and followed with a studio album, Transcendence into the Peripheral, in 1993. They disbanded shortly thereafter – never having performed live. AllMusic's Eduardo Rivadavia described them as "[s]till revered in underground circles as doom-grind pioneers ... [their works] remain genre classics".

History
Disembowelment formed in Melbourne in November 1989 from the demise of a two-piece grind band Bacteria, featuring Renato Gallina on guitar and vocals, and Paul Mazziotta on drums. With the help of Dean Ruprich from Melbourne death/grind band Necrotomy providing session bass guitar, the band released its first demo, "Mourning September" in September 1990. Disembowelment played a very slow form of doom – with occasional bursts of great speed – that relied equally on the atmospheric effects of droning guitars and constant riffing. The band was known for its atmospheric chanting, slow riffs and spiritual dark elements present in their symphonic, heavily distorted style. They are often credited with spawning the funeral doom movement that developed years later.

In 1991, Jason Kells joined the band on lead guitar. The song "Extracted Nails" was recorded in April 1991 at Double Tea Studios for a compilation on the German label Mangled Beyond Recognition, released the following year. The compilation featured Therion, God Macabre, Rottrevore, Cadaver, Crematory, Pan.Thy.Monium, Cenotaph, and Hydr Hydr. On 3–4 August 1991, the band went back to Double Tea studios to record their second demo, "Deep Sensory Perception into Aural Fate". This recording marked a big step forward in the maturity of the songwriting, performance and overall production. The demo sparked the interest of Relapse Records, who signed them up and released the demo as the Dusk extended play in 1992. It was an edited version of the demo which omitted the linking piece of music between the two tracks. It included the first recorded version of "Cerulean Transience of all My Imagined Shores", a third track not featured on the earlier demo.

At the end of 1991, Matthew Skarajew (ex-Sanctum, lead guitar) had joined the group on bass guitar and they recorded "Cerulean Transience of all My Imagined Shores" the following year. Initially as full time bass guitarist for his early sessions, later he added guitar work (acoustic and melodic). In 1993 Disembowelment released their debut studio album, Transcendence into the Peripheral, which featured a slowly executed drumming style, accompanied by death metal vocals, chants and passages of dark ambience. Disembowelment split up after the album's release. Prior to breaking up, they had mentioned the possibility of a one-off live show that "would be an event, a unique concert". However it never eventuated. At the time they had rehearsed and prepared five cover versions for a potential EP. "Slaughtered Remains" (cover of a Necrovore track) was a demo track which appeared in 2005 on a bonus disc of the limited release of Disembowelment compilation. This featured Mazziotta on drums, Skarajew on guitars and Gallina layered a new vocal track onto it 3 years later.

Allmusic's Eduardo Rivadavia described Disembowelment as "[s]till revered in underground circles as doom-grind pioneers ... [their works] remain genre classics". Justin Donnelly of Metal Forge declared they were "the legendary unground  Australian doom/grindcore/ambient act" and "often referred to as merely a doom band, the sort of music ... is actually far more than eclectic and broad sounding than simply labelling them to one particular genre".

Gallina and Skarajew continued working together in the ethno ambient act, Trial of the Bow, which Skarajew had initiated during his time in Disembowelment. The group released an EP, Ornamentation, and an album, Rite of Passage, to critical approval, notably Rolling Stone and Wired Magazine. Trial of the Bow was licensed to Rykodisc soon after. From 2004 Skarajew and Mazziotta formed a grind band, Pulgar. In October 2005 Disembowelment's catalogue was re-released as a double and limited edition triple CD, Disembowelment by Relapse Records. Two different limited edition vinyl box sets were later released. A related band, d.USK, formed in 2010 with original Disembowelment members Skarajew and Mazziotta and played some their former group's material as a live band. In late 2011 d.USK split and re-emerged under the name Inverloch, which plays a different form of death/doom than Disembowelment and d.USK.

In 2019 Renato revisited the track "Nightside of Eden" gifting it to the forum Doom-Metal.com. The track was released alongside a statement and digital download links for both WAV and mp3 formats. 

2020 saw the limited repressing of "Transcendence into the Peripheral" and the release of "Dusk / Deep Sensory Procession into Aural Fate" under Relapse Records, which combined Disembowelment's only EP and a remaster of their second demo.

Discography 
 Mourning September (Demo, 1990)
 Deep Sensory Procession into Aural Fate (Demo, 1991)
 Dusk (EP, 1992)
 Transcendence into the Peripheral (studio, 1993)
 Disembowelment (2×CD/3×CD compilation, 2005)
 Dusk / Deep Sensory Procession into Aural Fate (2xLP Compilation, 2020)

References

External links 
 
 Disembowelment at Doom-metal.com
 Disembowelment at MySpace

Musical groups established in 1989
Musical groups from Melbourne
Australian death metal musical groups
Australian doom metal musical groups
Relapse Records artists
Musical groups disestablished in 1993